Haworth Pictures Corporation was a film studio established by Japanese actor Sessue Hayakawa in March 1918.

Haworth Pictures Corporation was Hollywood’s first Asian-owned production company.

Filmography 
 His Birthright (1918)
 The Temple of Dusk (1918)
 Banzai (1918, short)
 Bonds of Honor (1919)
 A Heart in Pawn (1919)
 The Courageous Coward (1919)
 His Debt (1919)
 The Man Beneath (1919)
 The Gray Horizon (1919)
 The House of Intrigue (1919)
 The Dragon Painter (1919)
 Bonds of Honor (1919)
 The Illustrious Prince (1919)
 The Tong Man (1919)
 The Beggar Prince (1920)
 The Brand of Lopez (1920)
 The Devil's Claim (1920)
 Li Ting Lang (1920)
 An Arabian Knight (1920)
 The Power of Love (1922)

References

Bibliography

External links 
 

Film production companies of the United States
American companies established in 1918
Haworth Pictures Corporation films